Melvin Holwijn (born 2 January 1980) is a Dutch football player who plays for ASV Arsenal in the Vierde Klasse.

Career
Holwijn was born in Amsterdam, and played in his youth for DCG, FC Abcoude, and Jong Ajax. He joined than from A.V.V. Zeeburgia to Telstar, who were promoted in July 1998. After five years with Telstar, Holwijn left the Netherlands and signed for the Greek club Iraklis Thessaloniki. He played in Greece for 18 months and, in January 2005, returned to the Netherlands signed to SC Cambuur. After another one and a half years, he left Cambuur and returned to his former club Telstar, becoming their second highest goalscorer of all time with 60 goals. He had a trial at Scottish Football League club Inverness Caledonian Thistle in summer 2009, but was not offered a contract. On 21 August 2009, he left Telstar and signed a one-year contract with FC Carl Zeiss Jena.

After a brief spell with FC Lisse, he joined amateur club Blauw-Wit Amsterdam in the summer of 2012. In November 2012, he signed for Barnet on a one-month contract, where Holwijn's former manager at Blauw-Wit, Ulrich Landvreugd, was assistant manager to Edgar Davids, and made his début on 8 December against AFC Wimbledon as an 83rd-minute substitute for George Barker. This was the only appearance he made for the club, and he was released in January 2013. Afterwards, he re-joined Blauw-Wit.

References

External links
 Kicker Profile

1980 births
Living people
Dutch footballers
SC Telstar players
Association football forwards
Footballers from Amsterdam
Iraklis Thessaloniki F.C. players
Expatriate footballers in Greece
AFC Ajax players
SC Cambuur players
FC Carl Zeiss Jena players
Barnet F.C. players
Expatriate footballers in England
Expatriate footballers in Germany
Dutch sportspeople of Surinamese descent
A.V.V. Zeeburgia players
Dutch expatriate footballers
Eerste Divisie players
Super League Greece players
Dutch expatriate sportspeople in England
Dutch expatriate sportspeople in Germany
Dutch expatriate sportspeople in Greece
English Football League players
Blauw-Wit Amsterdam players
FC Lisse players
3. Liga players